Brian Wright may refer to:

 Brian Wright (American football) (born 1960), American football coach and player
 Brian Wright (musician), recording artist on Sugar Hill Records
 Brian Wright (rugby league), Australian rugby league player
 Brian Wright (Scottish footballer) (born 1958), Scottish former football player and manager
 Brian Wright (soccer) (born 1995), Canadian soccer player
 Brian Wright (table tennis) (born 1943), English table tennis international
 Brian Wright (writer) (1918–2013), Australian writer, producer, and director
 Brian Brendan Wright (born c. 1947), Irish criminal involved in fixing horse races and drug trafficking

See also
 Bryant Wright (21st century), American evangelical minister